Mahane Israel is  an early Jewish neighborhood in Jerusalem built outside the Old City walls.

Mahane Israel may also refer to:
 Machneh Israel (Chabad), the Chabad movement's social service organization